Streblus elongatus, sometimes referred to as Artocarpus elongatus, is a type of tree. The plant produces white latex wherever it is cut. It has been referred to as Sloetia elongata in the past.

It is commonly known as "tempinis" in Malay and are used as place names in Southeast Asia. In Singapore, Sungei Tampines river and Tampines Town are named after it. In Kuala Lumpur, Malaysia, the streets of a neighbourhood in Bangsar suburb are named, for example, Jalan Tempinis, Jalan Tempinis Kanan/Kiri and Lorong Tempinis Kiri 5.

References

elongatus